Harry Camsell School is a JK – 3 school located in Hay River, Northwest Territories, Canada providing public education from kindergarten to grade 3. The administration of the school is the responsibility of the South Slave Divisional Education Council (SSDEC).

References

External links
Harry Camsell at the South Slave Divisional Education Council

Elementary schools in the Northwest Territories